"Reminds Me" is a song by German singer Kim Petras, released as a single on 11 February 2020. Australian rapper the Kid Laroi and American rapper Juice Wrld released a cover of the song, re-titled "Reminds Me of You", on 8 December 2020.

Promotion

On 8 February, Petras performed the song at Manchester Academy on the second night of her two night stint. On the single's release date, Petras tweeted: "💔 #REMINDSME IS OUT NOW 💔 i wanted to make a song for everyone else that might not be getting flowers n chocolates this valentines day . stream this shit if u feel me !!" The song's release was accompanied with an announcement that Petras would join Camila Cabello for the European leg of The Romance Tour. In 2020, she performed the song on Vevo Lift.

Description and reception

MTV's Madeline Roth described "Reminds Me" as an "anti-Valentine's song" and an "ice-cold breakup bop", with Petras "spilling her thoughts over a springy R&B beat". Shaad D'Souza of The Fader called the song a "downcast, mid-tempo trap ballad" and the "kind of breakup track that would have fit perfectly on Petras' recent debut album Clarity". Capital FM made a very similar description, also calling the track "steady". Idolators Mike Nied described the song as a "bop" with "relatable" lyrics, which he said "capture what it feels like to have your heart broken by someone you trusted". Nied said the song has Petras "chasing away memories of an ex" and "[mourning] over a sparse soundscape. Consequence of Sounds Lake Schatz described "Reminds Me" as a "thumpin' tune", and Valerie Stepanova of V Magazine called the song a "beat-heavy breakup bop". Billy Nilles of E! News wrote that the song was "remarkably relatable". Laura Johnson from Stereoboard outlined the song as "beat-heavy, R&B influenced pop track".

Juice Wrld and the Kid Laroi cover version 

"Reminds Me of You" is a song by American rapper Juice Wrld and Australian rapper the Kid Laroi, released on 8 December 2020, via Grade A Productions through exclusive licensing to Interscope Records and marketed by Foundation Media.

Background 

The song marks their third official collaboration, and it was released on 8 December 2020, which is the one-year anniversary of Juice Wrld's death. About the song, Petras stated:

Composition 

On the track, the Kid Laroi and Juice Wrld talk about how everything reminds them of their past lovers and lament how hard it is for them to move on after a failed relationship. The song "re-imagines" Petras' version, "morphing her electro-pop euphoria" into a heartbroken emo-rap song.

Credits and personnel 

Credits adapted from Tidal:
 Jarad Higgins – vocals, songwriting, composition
 Charlton Howard – vocals, songwriting, composition
 Kim Petras – songwriting, composition
 Aaron Joseph – songwriting, composition, production
 Lukasz Gottwald – songwriting, composition, production
 Sam Sumser – songwriting, composition, production
 Sean Small – songwriting, composition, production
 Theron Thomas – songwriting, composition, production
 Dale Becker – mastering
 Serban Ghenea – mixing
 Clint Gibbs – studio personnel
 John Hanes – studio personnel
 Kalani Thompson – studio personnel
 Seth Ringo – studio personnel
 Tyler Sheppard – studio personnel

Charts

References

External links
 

2020 singles
2020 songs
2020s ballads
Interscope Records singles
Kim Petras songs
Pop ballads
Contemporary R&B ballads
Electropop songs
Songs released posthumously
Songs written by Dr. Luke
Songs written by Kim Petras
Songs written by Theron Thomas
Songs about heartache
Songs written by Sam Sumser
Songs written by Sean Small